Francisco Javier López (born 29 December 1989) is a Spanish athlete specialising in the sprint hurdles. He won a bronze medal at the 2012 Ibero-American Championships and a gold medal at the 2013 Spanish National Championships.

His personal bests are 13.62 seconds in the 110 metres hurdles (+1.2 m/s, Castellón 2015) and 7.69 seconds in the 60 metres hurdles (Pittsburgh 2016).

International competitions

References

1989 births
Living people
Spanish male hurdlers
Sportspeople from Córdoba, Spain
Spanish expatriates in the United States
Competitors at the 2013 Summer Universiade